is a Japanese television drama series that aired on Fuji TV in 2007. Mao Inoue played the lead role for the first time in getsuku drama. The first episode received a viewership rating of 19.7%.

Plot
A bitter-sweet and uplifting comedy drama about a young girl Mio and her brother Kazuki. To treat her illness overseas, Mio has been living away from her older brother Kazuki for the past ten years. After learning about the upcoming surgery, which she has only a fifty percent chance of survival, Mio decides to fly back to Japan to spend time with Kazuki. Looking forward to seeing his sweet younger sister, Kazuki anxiously awaits Mio's return in Japan. However, their reunion is nothing but full of surprises as Mio has transformed from the innocent sickly girl Kazuki remembers from ten years ago into a sassy woman with an attitude. Kazuki has difficulty dealing with his wickedly selfish younger sister, but soon learns about the truth of her medical condition and has a change of heart.

Cast
 Mao Inoue as Mio Fukunaga
 Hideaki Itō as Kazuki Kanō
 Mari Natsuki as Rieko Fukunaga
 Yūta Hiraoka as Akio Yūki
 Wakana Sakai as Haruna Saitō
 Naoto Takenaka

References

External links
 Official site 
 

2007 Japanese television series debuts
2007 Japanese television series endings
Fuji TV dramas
Japanese drama television series
Television shows written by Yumiko Inoue
Japanese romance television series